Flats East Bank is a station on the RTA Waterfront Line in Cleveland, Ohio. The station is located along West 10th Street just southeast of its intersection with Main Avenue in The Flats district.

History

The station opened on July 10, 1996,
when light rail service was extended 2.2 miles from Tower City through The Flats and along the lakefront. This extension was designated the Waterfront Line, although it is actually an extension of the Blue and Green Lines, as trains leaving this station toward Tower City continue along the Blue or Green Line routes to Shaker Heights.

Station layout

Notable places nearby
 The Flats
 Warehouse District
 Ernst & Young Tower
 The Pinnacle

References

Waterfront Line (RTA Rapid Transit)
Railway stations in the United States opened in 1996
Railway stations closed in 2020
1996 establishments in Ohio